Itzhak "Ben" Bentov (also Ben-Tov; ; August 9, 1923 – May 25, 1979) was an Israeli American scientist, inventor, mystic and author. His many inventions, including the steerable cardiac catheter, helped pioneer the biomedical engineering industry. He was also an early proponent of what has come to be referred to as consciousness studies and authored several books on the subject.

Bentov was killed in the crash of American Airlines Flight 191 shortly after takeoff from Chicago O'Hare Airport in 1979, which remains the worst non-terrorism-related aviation disaster to have taken place on US soil.

Early life 
Bentov was born in Humenné, Czechoslovakia, in 1923. During World War II, his parents, his younger brother and sister were killed in Nazi concentration camps.

He narrowly escaped being sent to the camps and moved to British Palestine, first living on the Shoval kibbutz in the Negev.

Despite not having a university degree, Bentov joined the Israeli Science Corps, which David Ben-Gurion incorporated into the Israeli Defense Forces one month before Israel declared statehood in 1948. The Science Corps became a military branch known by the Hebrew acronym HEMED. Bentov designed Israel's first rocket for the War of Independence. HEMED was forced to make improvised weapons as there was a worldwide embargo on selling weapons to the Jewish state.

Bentov immigrated to the United States in 1954, and settled in Massachusetts. He became a naturalized U.S. citizen in 1962.

Inventions 
Bentov began with a workshop in the basement of a Catholic church in Belmont, Massachusetts in the 1960s. In 1967, he built the steerable heart catheter and attracted the attention of businessman John Abele, with whom Bentov founded the Medi-Tech corporation in 1969.

Abele later recalled of Bentov's workshop,

In 1979, Abele and Peter Nicholas looked to grow the successful business and established Boston Scientific as a holding company to purchase Medi-Tech.

Bentov was the holder of numerous patents. In addition to the steerable cardiac catheter, his inventions included diet spaghetti, automobile brake shoes, EKG electrodes and pacemaker leads.

Patents

Spirituality 
Bentov was fascinated by consciousness, in particular how it related to physiology. In his 1977 book, Stalking the Wild Pendulum: On the Mechanics of Consciousness, he wrote that "consciousness permeates everything".

Bentov's invention was a seismographic device to record the heartbeat, in particular the aorta's reverberations. Marc Seifer described the results: "During normal breathing, the reverberations in the aorta are out of phase with the heartbeat and the system is inharmonious. However, during meditation and when the breath is held, the echo off the bifurcation of the aorta (where the aorta forks at the pelvis to go into each leg) is in resonance with the heartbeat and the system becomes synchronized, thus utilizing a minimum amount of energy. This resonant beat is approximately seven cycles per minute, which corresponds not only to the alpha rhythm of the brain but also to the low-level magnetic pulsations of the Earth."

Personal life
Bentov had a daughter, Sharona Ben-Tov Muir, with his first wife, whom he would divorce. Later he married Ukrainian-born sculptor and poetess Mirtala Serhiivna Pylypenko-Kardinalovska (Kharkiv, 1929), also known as Mirtala Bentov.

Death and legacy 
Bentov was killed on May 25, 1979, as a passenger aboard American Airlines Flight 191 that crashed shortly after takeoff from O'Hare International Airport in Chicago.  At the time of his death, he was traveling to California, where he had been set to present his ideas on science and mysticism to a group of scientists from Japan. He was 55 years old. His daughter, English professor Sharona Ben-Tov Muir, wrote a memoir about her father, The Book of Telling: Tracing the Secrets of My Father's Lives in 2005. It was not until after his death that she learned about his life in the Israeli Defense Forces and that he had created Israel's first rocket. Searching for answers as to why he never discussed this part of his life, Muir traveled to Israel and researched his years there.

Published works 
Stalking the Wild Pendulum: On the Mechanics of Consciousness, E. P. Dutton, 1977, ; Inner Traditions – Bear and Company, 1988, 
A Brief Tour of Higher Consciousness: A Cosmic Book on the Mechanics of Creation, Inner Traditions – Bear and Company, 2000, 
A Cosmic Book on the Mechanics of Creation with Mirtala Bentov, Dutton Books, 1982, 
Micromotions of the body as a factor in the development of the nervous system, a centerpiece article published in the anthology Kundalini, Evolution, and Enlightenment by John White, editor, 1998,

References

Further reading 
 Sharona Ben-Tov Muir, The Book of Telling: Tracing the Secrets of My Father's Lives. Bison, 2008. .

External links 
 
 Review of his work from an article that first appeared in PS-Magazine.com

1923 births
1979 deaths
American inventors
Consciousness researchers and theorists
20th-century mystics
Czechoslovak Jews
20th-century Israeli Jews
Czechoslovak emigrants to Mandatory Palestine
Israeli emigrants to the United States
American people of Slovak-Jewish descent
Accidental deaths in Illinois
Israeli mechanical engineers
Scientists from Prague
Victims of aviation accidents or incidents in 1979
Victims of aviation accidents or incidents in the United States
Naturalized citizens of the United States
Transcendental Meditation exponents